Croft Bay is a bay which indents the north-central side of James Ross Island and forms the southern part of Herbert Sound, south of the northeastern end of the Antarctic Peninsula. It was discovered in 1903 by the Swedish Antarctic Expedition under Otto Nordenskiöld. It was charted in 1945 by the Falkland Islands Dependencies Survey (FIDS), who named it for W.N. Croft, a FIDS geologist at Hope Bay in 1946.

References
 

Bays of James Ross Island